Functional may refer to:
 Movements in architecture:
 Functionalism (architecture)
 Form follows function
 Functional group, combination of atoms within molecules
 Medical conditions without currently visible organic basis:
 Functional symptom
 Functional disorder
 Functional classification for roads 
 Functional organization
 Functional training

In mathematics 
 Functional (mathematics), a term applied to certain scalar-valued functions in mathematics and computer science
 Functional analysis
 Linear functional, a type of functional often simply called a functional in the context of functional analysis
 Higher-order function, also called a functional, a function that takes other functions as arguments

In computer science, software engineering 
  (C++), a header file in the C++ Standard Library
 Functional design, a paradigm used to simplify the design of hardware and software devices
 Functional model, a structured representation of functions, activities or processes in systems and software engineering
 Functional programming, a programming paradigm based on mathematical functions rather than changes in variable states
 In an ontology (information science), "functional" is a property or relation that can only hold a single value for a given individual

See also 
 
 Function (disambiguation)
 Functionalism (disambiguation)
 Functional group (disambiguation)
 Functional grammar (disambiguation)